Snyder Independent School District (SISD) is a public school district based in Snyder, Texas (USA).

Located in Scurry County, small portions of the district extend into Kent and Mitchell counties.

In 2009, the school district was rated "academically acceptable" by the Texas Education Agency.

History
On July 1, 1990 the district absorbed a portion of the Hobbs Independent School District.

In 2019 the Texas Education Agency announced it would take control of the district, vacating the elected board.

Schools
Snyder High (Grades 9-12)
Snyder Junior High (Grades 6-8)
Snyder Primary (Grades K-2)
Snyder Intermediate (Grades 3-5)
Snyder Academy (Grades 6-12)
Stanfield Elementary (Special Education, Pre-K and PPCD Departments)
Hobbs Alternative (Grades 9-12)

References

External links
Snyder Independent School District

School districts in Scurry County, Texas
School districts in Kent County, Texas
School districts in Mitchell County, Texas